John Poston may refer to:
 John Poston (British Army officer)
 John Poston (politician), member of the Minnesota House of Representatives